I&M Bank Uganda, formerly Orient Bank, whose complete name is I&M Bank (Uganda) Limited, is a commercial bank in Uganda which is licensed by the Bank of Uganda (BOU), the central bank and national banking regulator.

Location
The bank's headquarters and main branch are located at Plot 6/6A Kampala Road, in the central business district of Kampala, Uganda's capital and largest city. The geographical coordinates of the bank's headquarters are: 
0°18'44.0"N, 32°35'08.0"E (Latitude:0.312222; Longitude:32.585556).

Overview
The bank is involved in all aspects of commercial banking, with emphasis on providing banking services to non-government organisations and their staffs. As of December 2019, the bank's total assets were valued at USh 814.3 billion (US$221.58 million), with shareholders' equity of USh 114.1 billion (approximately US$31.05 million).

History
The bank was founded in 1993 by a group of business people who were related by blood and marriage.

In 1996, the bank opened its second branch in the city of Jinja, about one hour's drive east of the capital Kampala. In 2002, the bank acquired Trans-Africa Bank Limited, which had been declared insolvent by the BOU.

Following a spate of Ugandan bank failures in the 1990s and early 2000s, the banking laws in Uganda were changed to bar family members from jointly owning more than 49 per cent in the same financial institution. Orient Bank was given a grace period to find a suitable investor.

In April 2009, Bank PHB Group, a Nigerian financial services group, acquired 80 per cent shareholding in Orient Bank for a cash payment of US$62 million. In August 2011, the group was itself declared insolvent by the Central Bank of Nigeria, and its assets and some liabilities were acquired by Keystone Bank Limited, which was owned by the Federal Government of Nigeria.

In July 2014, international media reported that Keystone Bank planned to divest from Orient Bank. In February 2015, Keystone Bank divested from Orient Bank by selling 42 per cent shareholding to the private equity firm 8 Miles Fund, whose shareholders include the celebrity and activist Bob Geldof. The remaining 38 per cent was sold to three individuals, namely Ketan Morjaria; one of the founders of the bank, Alemayehu Fisseha, and Zhong Shuang Quan.

Ownership

As of February 2015, the shareholding of the bank was as depicted in the table below:

Acquisition
In July 2020, I&M Holdings Limited signed an agreement with the shareholders of Orient Bank Limited, to buy 90 per cent equity in the issued share capital of Orient Bank Limited. The transaction is valued in excess of KSh 2 billion (US$20 million), and is subject to regulatory approval from Uganda and Kenya.

In November 2020, the Business Daily Africa newspaper reported that I&M Holdings Limited of Kenya would pay US$33.6 million in exchange for 90 per cent shareholding in Orient Bank. After the acquisition has been concluded, the shareholding in the institution would look as illustrated in the table below.

The acquisition of 90 per cent shareholding in this bank by I&M Holdings Limited was concluded on 30 April 2021 when necessary approvals were obtained from the "Central Bank of Kenya, the Bank of Uganda, the Capital Markets Authority of Kenya and the Common Market for Eastern and Southern Africa (COMESA)".

At the time it was acquired, I&M Bank Uganda, according to The East African newspaper, had a customer base of about 70,000, deposits worth KSh 18.2 billion (US$170.09 million), and a net loan book of approximately KSh 7.7 billion (US$71.96 million). At that time, the bank employed 340 members of staff, in 14 networked branches, and maintained 22 automated teller machines.

On 8 November 2021, Orient Bank rebranded to I&M Bank Uganda, following authorization by the Bank of Uganda.

In January 2022, the Business Daily Africa reported that the final price paid for the 90 per cent shares in Orient Bank had risen from KSh 3.6 billion to KSh 4.1 billion, after valuation of the quality of assets of the acquired subsidiary. (KSh 4.1 billion was about US$36.26 million on 31 January 2022). The final payment is expected to conclude in July 2022.

Governance
The bank is governed by an eight-person board of directors, two of whom are executive directors and the other six are non-executive. Suleiman I. Kiggundu, Jr., one  of the non-executive directors, is the chairman. Kumaran Pather is the managing director and chief executive officer. Sam Ntulume serves as the executive director at the bank.

Branch network
, the bank had a network of branches in the central, eastern, and northern regions of Uganda. The branches of the bank included the following locations:

 Main Branch - I&M Plaza, 6/6A Kampala Road, Kampala
 Acacia Branch: Acacia Shopping Mall, Kisementi, Kololo, Kampala
 Arua Branch: 1Acacia Mall, Kisementi, Kampala
 Bweyogerere Branch: Mamerito House, Jinja Road, Bweyogerere
 Entebbe Town Branch: 29 Kampala Road, Entebbe
 Jinja City Branch: 8 Lady Alice Muloki Road, Jinja
 Kabalagala Branch: 1900 Ggaba Road, Kabalagala, Kampala
 Kawempe Branch: 78 Bombo Road, Kawempe, Kampala
 Kololo Branch: Nyonyi Gardens, 16/17 Wampeewo Avenue, Kololo, Kampala
 Ntinda Branch: Capital Shoppers Mall, Ntinda Road, Ntinda
 William Street Branch - William Street, Kampala.

See also

Banking in Uganda
Ugandan Commercial Banks
Credit Bank

References

External links
 Website of I&M Bank Uganda
 Interview With Ketan Morjaria, Vice Chairman, Orient Bank: Done In October 2009
 8 Miles Fund I To Deliver First Exit As of 5 August 2020.

Banks of Uganda
Banks established in 1993
Companies based in Kampala
1993 establishments in Uganda
I&M Bank Group